Michael Arthur Nathan Loewe (born 2 November 1922) is a British Sinologist, historian, and writer who has authored dozens of books, articles, and other publications in the fields of Classical Chinese as well as the history of ancient and early Imperial China.

Life and career 
Michael Loewe was born on 2 November 1922 in Oxford, England, to a distinguished Anglo-Jewish family. Loewe's great-grandfather Louis Loewe (1809–1888) was a Prussian Silesian professor of Oriental studies and theology who later emigrated to Britain, and was the personal secretary of the British Jewish businessman, financier, and philanthropist Moses Montefiore. Loewe's father, Herbert Loewe, was a professor of Semitic languages who taught at both Cambridge University and Oxford University. Loewe's mother, Ethel Victoria Hyamson, was the sister of the British official and historian Albert Hyamson. His elder brother Raphael Loewe (1919–2011) was, like their father, a scholar of Semitic languages, and was a professor of Hebrew and Jewish studies at University College London. Loewe was married to Carmen Blacker, a scholar in the Japanese language.

Loewe attended secondary school at The Perse School in Cambridge, then entered Magdalen College, Oxford. Following the outbreak of war with Japan in December 1941, Loewe was assigned to learn Japanese at the secret Bedford Japanese School run by Captain Oswald Tuck RN. He was on the first course, which began in February 1942 and lasted for five months. Towards the end of the course some training in cryptography was given. After completing the course Loewe was posted to Bletchley Park, where he worked in the Naval Section until the end of the war. He studied Mandarin Chinese in his spare time. During a six-month stay in Beijing in 1947, Loewe became interested in traditional and historical Chinese topics, which he began studying at the School of African and Oriental Studies, University of London after returning to Britain. He received a first class honours degree in Chinese in 1951, and in 1956 he left the government to serve as a Lecturer in the History of the Far East at the University of London. SOAS awarded him a PhD in 1963, and he subsequently joined the faculty at Cambridge, where he taught until retiring in 1990 to focus solely on research and scholarship.  He is a fellow of Clare Hall, Cambridge.

Honours 
 Royal Asiatic Society, member.
 American Academy of Arts and Sciences, honorary member.

A unique award in Loewe's honour exists at Cambridge: the "Michael Loewe Prize" may be awarded annually to one or more undergraduate candidates who have achieved distinction in literary Chinese.

Selected works 
 
 
 
 ——— (1968).  Everyday Life in Early Imperial China During the Han Period. London: B.T. Batsford. Reprinted (1988), New York: Dorset Press.
 
 
 
 
 
 
 
 
 ———; Shaughnessy, Edward, eds. (1999).  The Cambridge History of Ancient China.  Cambridge: Cambridge University Press.

Notes

References

Citations

Sources 
 Works cited

Biography of Michel Loewe, Cambridge University.

External links 
  Michael Loewe Scholarship Fund, Cambridge University.
 Roel Sterckx interviews Michael Loewe, for Conversations . 

1922 births
Alumni of Magdalen College, Oxford
Alumni of the University of London
British sinologists
English historians
English Jewish writers
Fellows of Clare Hall, Cambridge
Jewish historians
Living people
People educated at The Perse School
People from Oxford